The Claremont-Mudd-Scripps Stags (men) and Athenas (women) is the joint intercollegiate sports program of Claremont McKenna College, Harvey Mudd College, and Scripps College, all located in Claremont, California. The teams participate in the NCAA's Division III as a member of the Southern California Intercollegiate Athletic Conference.

Individual teams and Graduation Information

Claremont-Mudd-Scripps competes in 21 men's and women's varsity sports. They have won 7 national championships and 346 SCIAC Championships.

National Champions 
*NCAA Division III unless otherwise noted.

Men's Golf

 2010 – Tain Lee
 2013 – Bradley Shigezawa
 2016 – Team

Men's Swim & Dive 

 1967 – Team (NAIA)
 1969 – Eric Jones (50y) (NAIA)
 1969 – David Tempkin (100, 200 Butterfly) (NAIA)
 1970 – Eric Jones (50y, 100y) (NAIA)
 1970 – David Tempkin (100, 200 Butterfly) (NAIA)
 2014 – Matt Williams (100 Backstroke)
 2022 - Frank Applebaum (200 Butterfly)

Men's Tennis

 1981 – Team
 1992 – Ryan McKee & Chris Noyes (Doubles)

 1993 – Ryan McKee (Individual, Doubles), Tim Cooley (Doubles)
 2015 – Team

Men's Track & Field

 1986 – Carl Giles (Hammer)
 1994 – Jason Rhodes (800m), Mike Susank (Hammer)
 1997 – Quang Leba (Javelin)
 2004 – Matt Roberson (Decathlon)
 2006 – Matt Roberson (Decathlon)

Women's Swim & Dive

 2002 – Suzy Nicoletti (200 Breast)
 2003 – Lisal Smith (400 IM)

Women's Track & Field

 1985 – Gwyn Hardesty (3000m)
 1998 – Jennifer Culley (400m)
 2016 – Tyra Abraham (100m)
 2018 – Tyra Abraham (100m)
 2018 – Bryn McKillop (5000m)
 2018 – Emily Bassett (Hammer)

Women's Tennis 

 2018 – Team
 2019 – Catherine Allen & Caroline Cox (doubles)

Women's Volleyball

 2017

Women's Water Polo

 1992 (Collegiate II)
 2001 (Collegiate III)

Athletic facilities on the Scripps campus 
 Basketball and Volleyball — Roberts Pavilion
 Lacrosse — John Zinda Field
 Softball — Softball Field
 Soccer — John Pritzlaff Field
 Swimming and Diving — Matt M. Axelrood Pool
 Tennis — Biszantz Family Tennis Center
 Track and Field — Burns Track Complex

Rivals
The other sports combination of the Claremont Colleges is the team made up of Pomona College and Pitzer College known as Pomona-Pitzer Sagehens. It is known by the student body as the Sixth Street Rivalry.

References

External links
 
 Coverage of the Stags and Athenas in The Student Life